Gathersnow Hill is a hill in the Culter Hills range, part of the Southern Uplands of Scotland. It lies west of the village of Tweedsmuir on the border of the Scottish Borders and South Lanarkshire. The second highest of the Culter Hills after Culter Fell to the north, the two Grahams are often climbed together.

Subsidiary SMC Summits

References

Marilyns of Scotland
Grahams
Donald mountains
Mountains and hills of Dumfries and Galloway
Mountains and hills of the Scottish Borders